Sichuan Leaders Football Club is a China League Two club. It is an association football club from Dujiangyan City. The Sichuan Leaders was a new entry in the 2014 China League Two. The Dujiangyan Sports Centre Stadium is their home venue.

In 2015 Sichuan Leaders failed to participate in China League Two due to wage arrears.

In January 2019 the registration of Sichuan Leaders F.C. was cancelled due to its failure to attend annual inspection for 2014 to 2016 as required.

Results

As of the end of 2014 season

All-time League rankings

:  in South League

References

Football clubs in China
Defunct football clubs in China